Carlos Sierra (c. 1932 – July 2014) was a Colombian sprinter. He competed in the men's 4 × 400 metres relay at the 1956 Summer Olympics.

References

1930s births
2014 deaths
Athletes (track and field) at the 1955 Pan American Games
Athletes (track and field) at the 1956 Summer Olympics
Colombian male sprinters
Olympic athletes of Colombia
Place of birth missing
Pan American Games competitors for Colombia